Footloose Widows is a 1926 silent film feature comedy produced and distributed by Warner Bros., directed by Roy Del Ruth and starring Louise Fazenda and Jacqueline Logan.

A print is preserved in the Library of Congress collection. A 16mm copy is housed at the Wisconsin Center for Film & Theater Research.

Cast
Louise Fazenda as Flo
Jacqueline Logan as Marian
Jason Robards, Sr. as Jerry
Douglas Gerrard as Grover
Neely Edwards as The Ex-Mayor
Arthur Hoyt as Henry
Jane Winton as Mrs. Drew
Mack Swain as Ludwig, Marian's husband in retrospect
John Miljan as Mr. Smith
Eddie Phillips as "Tuxedo" Eddie
Henry A. Barrows as Hotel Manager

References

External links

thumb size version lobby poster(Wayback recovered)
Warner Bros. original poster
 lobby poster

1926 films
American silent feature films
Films directed by Roy Del Ruth
Films based on American novels
Silent American comedy films
Warner Bros. films
American black-and-white films
1926 comedy films
1920s American films